Mahama Asei Seini (born 15 November 1960) is a Ghanaian politician. He is a member of the Eighth Parliament of the Fourth Republic of Ghana representing the Daboya Mankarigu Constituency in the North Gonja District in the Savannah Region of Ghana. He is the deputy minister for Health

Early Life and Career 
Seini was born on 15 November 1960. He hails from Daboya. He holds a Degree in B.A  Economic AND Law (1992). He was a Chief revenue officer of Ghana Revenue Authority.

Politics 
Seini  is a member of the New Patriotic Party. He was the party's candidate for the December 2020 election. He won the parliamentary election with 14,391 votes representing 59.6% of the total votes cast, beating his main opponent and incumbent member of parliament Shaibu Mahama of the NDC who obtained 9,751 votes representing 40.4% of the total valid votes cast.

Committees 
He serves as a member of the Gender and Children Committee and Food, Agriculture and Cocoa Affairs Committee respectively in the Eighth Parliament of the Fourth Republic of Ghana.

Personal life 
He is a Muslim.

References 

Living people
Ghanaian MPs 2021–2025
1960 births